The Action Max is a home video game console using VHS tapes for games. It was manufactured in 1987 by Worlds of Wonder. The system had a very limited release outside the U.S.

Gameplay

The Action Max system requires the player to also have a VCR, as the console has no way to play the requisite VHS tapes itself. Using light guns, players shoot at the screen. The gaming is strictly point-based and dependent on shot accuracy, and as a result, players can't truly win or lose a game. The system's post-launch appeal was limited by this and by the fact that the only real genre on the system were light gun games that played exactly the same way every time, leading to its quick market decline.

Games 
Five VHS cassettes were released for the system:

.38 Ambush Alley, a police target range; 
Blue Thunder, based on the eponymous 1983 motion picture; 
Hydrosub: 2021, a futuristic underwater voyage; 
The Rescue of Pops Ghostly, a comic haunted-house adventure; 
Sonic Fury, aerial combat, bundled with the system.

Technical specifications
CPU: HD401010
Internal Speaker
TV mounted "Score Signal"
2 Character, 7 segment LED score display

See also
Control-Vision a prototypical VHS video game console
View-Master Interactive Vision, another VHS-based console

References

External links 
 Action Max Calibration Screen
 Action Max on OLD-COMPUTERS.COM
 Action Max Emulator
 Feature titled "THE MOST BIZARRE CONSOLE FLOPS IN GAMING HISTORY" by ADAM JAMES at SVG.com

Home video game consoles
Third-generation video game consoles
Products introduced in 1987
1980s toys
Worlds of Wonder (toy company) products
Light guns
VHS